Jeremy Glazer (born November 1, 1978) is an American actor. He is best known for his roles in the films Letters From Iwo Jima, Save Me, In The Clouds and Rust Creek. Glazer's performances include big-budget blockbusters and independent films, theatre, and television shows such as Modern Family, Grey's Anatomy, Castle and Desperate Housewives.

Early life
Glazer was born and raised in Huntington Station, New York on Long Island, in a Jewish family alongside his older brother, Daniel Glazer, a former talent agent and now successful commercial real estate broker in New York. During his childhood summers, he competed in many athletics at a sports camp in West Virginia.  He attended Walt Whitman High School, South Huntington and was elected President of his class from sophomore to senior year. He began performing in school theatre productions, competed in All-County Chorus, and played varsity tennis. His father, Roger Glazer, and mother, Evelyn Cohen, are retired high school health and physical education teachers.

Glazer attended the University of Delaware, majoring in Mass Communications and minoring in Theatre. During his summer semesters off from college, Glazer lived in Los Angeles and interned in the entertainment industry for talent agencies and production companies. He graduated from college with a bachelor's degree and moved to Los Angeles. He first worked as a production assistant at Paramount Pictures on television shows including The Trouble With Normal, Spring Break Lawyer and Men, Women & Dogs. Glazer then began acting.

Career

He appeared in the film Letters from Iwo Jima, which was directed by Clint Eastwood in 2006, and Save Me.  He co-produced and appeared in Good Dick, which premiered at the Sundance Film Festival in 2008. He has also appeared in Moonlight Serenade and When Do We Eat? playing a young Jack Klugman.

Glazer has made many appearances on the television shows Grey's Anatomy, Modern Family, The Fosters, CSI:NY, CSI: Crime Scene Investigation, Castle, Devious Maids, The Mentalist, Beauty & the Beast, Desperate Housewives, In Plain Sight, Veronica Mars, ER and Angel.

He won the LA Weekly Best Male Comedy Award for his leading role in Block Nine. He worked along with the Broadway cast of The Little Dog Laughed. Other theatre roles include playing both Dorian Gray and James Vane in A Picture of Dorian Gray at the Boston Court Theatre in Los Angeles, You Can't Take It With You at The Antaeus Theatre, The Sandstorm, 7 Redneck Cheerleaders and Anything with The Elephant Theatre Company.

In 2019, Glazer stars in the movie Samir with Sprague Grayden, Michelle Lukes, and Peter Greene.

Personal life
In November 2006, Greg Hernandez wrote in his column, "Out in Hollywood" in The Los Angeles Daily News that Glazer was actor Chad Allen's partner, both appearing in the film Save Me. In October 2008, AfterElton.com noted that Allen was Glazer's boyfriend. In May 2009, photojournalist Bill Wilson wrote in the San Francisco Sentinel that when Allen accepted a GLAAD Media Award, he announced that he had met Glazer, his partner, exactly four years earlier. Jeremy Glazer and Chad Allen are no longer partners. They were together from 2005-2011.

Filmography

TV

Film

Video game

References

External links
 
 

1978 births
Living people
People from Huntington Station, New York
Jewish American male actors
American male film actors
American male television actors
Male actors from New York (state)
University of Delaware alumni
Male actors from Los Angeles
Gay Jews
American gay actors
LGBT people from New York (state)
21st-century American Jews